The National Soccer League 1982 season was the sixth season of the National Soccer League in Australia.  The champions were Sydney City SC for the third year in a row.

League table

Individual awards

Player of the Year: Peter Katholos (Sydney Olympic)
U-21 Player of the Year: David Lowe (Newcastle KB United)
Top Scorer(s): John Kosmina (Sydney City – 23 goals)
Coach of the Year: Frank Arok (St George-Budapest)

References
OzFootball Archives - 1982 NSL Season

National Soccer League (Australia) seasons
1
Aus